Dean Kuriakose (27 June 1981) is an Indian politician from Kerala and a member of the Indian National Congress. Dean Kuriakose was the president of the Youth Congress Kerala wing of Indian Youth Congress. He is elected as member of parliament from Idukki lok sabha constituency in 2019 with record lead of 1,71,053 lakhs votes.

References

Indian National Congress politicians from Kerala
Living people
India MPs 2019–present
1981 births